Katak-e Olya (also Romanized as Katak-e ‘Olyā and Kotok-e ‘Olyā; also known as Katak-e Bālā and Kotok) is a village in Gandoman Rural District, Gandoman District, Borujen County, Chaharmahal and Bakhtiari Province, Iran. At the 2006 census, its population was 63, in 18 families. The village is populated by Lurs.

References

External link 
 Nearby Airport in Katak-e Olya

Populated places in Borujen County
Luri settlements in Chaharmahal and Bakhtiari Province